Setareh Malekzadeh, also professionally known as Ghogha (Persian: غوغا), is a rapper, lyricist, singer and visual artist from Tehran, Iran, currently living in Stockholm, Sweden. She uses modern Persian poetry as lyrical influence referring to some of the Iranian modernist poets such as Forough Farrokhzad and Fereydoon Moshiri.
Her lyrics are about philosophy, politics and women's rights. She has performed in a music festival called Voices of Change powered by Swedish National Theater, Riksteatern, in 2010. She has also appeared in a music program called Tracks on Arte Television Network in which she criticizes the Islamic laws forbidding women to express themselves through music.

References

External links

1989 births
Living people
Iranian women rappers
21st-century Iranian women singers
Iranian hip hop musicians
Iranian songwriters
Musicians from Tehran
Iranian emigrants to Sweden